Bob Beattie may refer to:

 Bob Beattie (American football) (1902–1983), American football player
 Bob Beattie (footballer) (born 1943), Australian football player
 Bob Beattie (skiing) (1933–2018), American skiing coach and television commentator

See also
 Bobby Beattie (1916–2002), Scottish footballer
 Robert Beattie (disambiguation)